The Cornell Big Red football team represents Cornell University in National Collegiate Athletic Association (NCAA) Division I Football Championship Subdivision (FCS) college football competition as a member of the Ivy League. It is one of the oldest and most storied football programs in the nation. The team has attained five national championships and has had seven players inducted into the College Football Hall of Fame.

History

In 1869, the first intramural football on the Cornell campus took place, although it did not resemble the modern sport and there were 40 players per side. In 1874, the university president and founder, Andrew Dickson White, disallowed a team of Cornell students from traveling to Cleveland, Ohio to play a Michigan team. White said, "I refuse to let 40 of our boys travel 400 miles merely to agitate a bag of wind." On November 12, 1887, Cornell played its first intercollegiate game against Union College, losing 24–10. The following year, the Cornellians record their first win by beating Palmyra, 26–0, and went on to finish the season with a 4–2 record. In 1889, Cornell played the University of Michigan in Buffalo, NY and beat Michigan 66–0.

In 1892, Glenn "Pop" Warner first played the game and the Cornellians finished the season having posted a 10–1 mark under "Father of Cornell football" Carl Johanson. Two years later Warner rose to become the team captain. After college, Warner began his coaching career and returned to Cornell in 1897. That year, he led the team to a 5–3–1 record. The following season, Cornell compiled a 10–2 record. Warner then moved on to coach the Carlisle Indians football team.

In 1901, under first-year coach Ray Starbuck, the Cornellians outscored their opponents 324–38 and won 11 games for the only time in school history. Pop Warner returned as head coach from 1904 to 1906, during which time his teams posted a 21–8 record.

Cornell began playing Ivy League rival Penn in 1893. They have played 122 times since, in every year except 1918, making this game the 5th most played college football contest in the nation.

In 1915, Cornell won all nine of its games. They handed Harvard their first loss in 50 consecutive games, 10–0. Gil Dobie took over as head coach in 1920. In his first season, the Cornellians posted a 6–2 record, but in each of the subsequent three years they finished 8–0. Cornell was awarded the national championship for each of those three seasons by at least one selector. In those seasons, Cornell outscored its opponents, 1,051 points to 71.

Cornell defeated Penn State, 21–6, in 1938 to begin a school record unbeaten streak of 16 games. The Big Red compiled an 8–0 record in 1939 for its fifth national championship. The possibility of a Rose Bowl invitation that season was rebuffed by the university administration. The unbeaten streak came to an end in 1940 with the infamous Fifth Down Game. After the game, Cornell voluntarily forfeited to Dartmouth when review of film showed the Big Red had inadvertently used five downs. The ESPN College Football Encyclopedia named the game, and Cornell's honorable concession, the second greatest moment in college football history.

In 1951, Cornell beat defending Big Ten and Rose Bowl champion Michigan, 20–7. Between 1969 and 1971, running back Ed Marinaro broke numerous NCAA records with a career total of 1,881 yards and 24 touchdowns. His senior year, he finished as runner-up in the Heisman Trophy voting behind Pat Sullivan of Auburn. That same season, Cornell finished 6–1 to secure a share of the Ivy League conference championship for the first time. Following the 1981 season, the Ivy League was reclassified to Division I-AA, today known as the Football Championship Subdivision (FCS), Cornell moved to Division I-AA play with the rest of the league.  Cornell twice more attained the Ivy League title, shared in 1988 with Penn and shared with Dartmouth in 1990. Beginning in 2018 Cornell will play New York State Ivy League rival, the Columbia Lions in their final game. The victor is awarded the Empire Cup.

The Ivy League announced that no sports would be played in the 2020 season because of the COVID-19 pandemic. The Big Red returned to Schoellkopf in September 2021 to play Virginia Military Institute, its first game after a 665-day hiatus.

Conference affiliations
 Independent (1887–1955)
 Ivy League (1956–present)

Championships

National championships
Cornell has won five (1915, 1921, 1922, 1923, 1939) national championships from NCAA-designated major selectors. Cornell claims all five championships.

Conference championships

Rivalries

Cornell has numerous rivalries in football. Their biggest rival is the Penn Quakers. The rivalry between the two schools is the sixth most played rivalry in college football history. They play for the Trusee's Cup. The series is led by Penn with a record of 75-47-4.
 Colgate–Cornell football rivalry
 Columbia–Cornell football rivalry
 Cornell–Dartmouth football rivalry
 Cornell–Penn football rivalry

Notable players

Consensus All-Americans
 1895 Clinton Wyckoff, B
 1900 Raymond Starbuck, B
 1901 William Warner, G
 1901 Sanford Hunt, G
 1902 William Warner, G
 1906 Elmer Thompson, G
 1906 William Newman, C
 1908 Bernard O'Rourke, C
 1914 John O'Hearn, E
 1914 Charles Barrett, B
 1915 Murray Shelton, E
 1915 Charles Barrett, B
 1921 Edgar Kaw, B
 1922 Edgar Kaw, B
 1923 George Pfann, B
 1932 Jose Martinez Zorrilla, E
 1938 Brud Holland, E
 1939 Nick Drahos, T
 1940 Nick Drahos, T
 1971 Ed Marinaro, RB (unanimous selection)

Players in the NFL Draft

Key

Numerous undrafted players have also played in the NFL. Pete Gogolak became the first soccer-style kicker in pro football in 1964; the most recent is Jacksonville Jaguars wide receiver Bryan Walters.

Others
Arthur Fazzin was captain of the team during the early 1940s. He later became an actor and game show host under the stage name Art Fleming.

Television
Cornell football, as well as the rest of the Ivy League Conference,  currently has a deal with ESPN in which ESPN agreed to a long-term relationship to showcase Ivy League events through a variety of ESPN platforms, including at least 24 events annually on ESPN’s linear networks and more than 1,100 annually on ESPN+, one of ESPN's earliest conference partners after launching ESPN+.

Future non-conference opponents 
Announced schedules as of December 12, 2022.

References

External links

 

 
American football teams established in 1887
1887 establishments in New York (state)